J. J. Koski (born December 27, 1996) is an American football wide receiver who is a free agent. He played college football at Cal Poly.

Early life and high school
Koski grew up in Danville, California and attended San Ramon Valley High School, where he played basketball and football and ran track. He caught 161 passes for 2,589 yards and 30 touchdowns during his high school career.

College career
Koski was a member of the Cal Poly Mustangs for five seasons, redshirting as a true freshman. He became a starter during his redshirt sophomore season and was named third-team All-Big Sky Conference as a redshirt junior after finishing the season with 33 receptions for 666 yards and four touchdowns. As a redshirt senior he caught 42 passes for 868 yards and eight touchdowns and was named first-team All-Big Sky. Koski finished his collegiate career with 121 receptions, 2,311 yards and 18 touchdowns.

Professional career
Koski was signed by the Los Angeles Rams as an undrafted free agent on April 25, 2020. He was waived on September 4, 2020, during final roster cuts, and was subsequently signed to the team's practice squad one day later. Koski signed a reserve/futures contract with the team on January 18, 2021. He was waived on August 31, 2021, at the end of training camp. The Rams signed Koski to their active roster on November 3, 2021. He made his NFL debut and returned one punt for seven yards in a 16–28 loss to the Tennessee Titans on November 7, 2021. Koski was later waived by the Rams on December 7 and re-signed to the practice squad. He was promoted back to the active roster on January 1, 2022. He was waived on January 4, 2022 and re-signed to the practice squad. Koski won Super Bowl LVI as a member of the Rams backup players when they defeated the Cincinnati Bengals.

On February 15, 2022, Koski signed a reserve/future contract with the Rams. He was waived/injured on August 20, 2022, and placed on injured reserve.

On March 10, 2023, Koski was waived by the Los Angeles Rams.

References

External links
Cal Poly Mustangs bio
Los Angeles Rams bio

1996 births
Living people
American football wide receivers
Players of American football from California
Cal Poly Mustangs football players
Los Angeles Rams players
People from Danville, California
Sportspeople from the San Francisco Bay Area